Deadman Lake is a lake in Sturgeon County, Alberta, Canada, located northwest of the city of Edmonton.

Deadman Lake's name comes from the Cree Indians of the area, on account of a deadly brawl which once took place near this lake.

See also
List of lakes of Alberta

References

Lakes of Alberta